A is the fifth English-language studio album by Swedish singer Agnetha Fältskog, a member of the group ABBA. It is her twelfth studio album overall.

A is Fältskog's first album since 2004's My Colouring Book, an album of cover versions of her favourite songs from the 1960s, and the first original material she had recorded since I Stand Alone in 1987. It also includes her first self-penned track in nearly 30 years, "I Keep Them on the Floor Beside My Bed" .

Album information
As Fältskog was not an active recording artist at the time, the album happened in a roundabout way. "The project came about through a good friend of mine", she explained. "She called me up and told me that Jörgen Elofsson and Peter Nordahl wanted to play me some music. They came to my house and played me three songs and I thought, 'Oh my God, I have to do this'. It felt like a challenge."

Ten tracks were recorded for the album at Atlantis Studio (sv), Stockholm, all of which were written or co-written by Elofsson.

Speaking with author Paul Stenning, Elofsson explained, "Agnetha is not just any artist, she is an icon with a rich heritage. We really felt the pressure of making something great, we didn't want to destroy anything for ABBA or Agnetha given the reputation they've built over the years. I'm really happy to say I think we pulled it off!"

Song information
The lead single from the album was "When You Really Loved Someone", which was released worldwide on 11 March 2013 as a digital download, with a CD single following on 15 April. A video clip for the song was filmed in late 2012, with Max Fowler and Camilla Rowling co-starring with Fältskog. In Germany and Austria the lead single was "The One Who Loves You Now", also released on 11 March 2013.

The track "I Should've Followed You Home" is a duet recorded with Gary Barlow of the British group Take That. Both artists recorded their vocal parts separately, as Fältskog was on holiday at the time of Barlow's recording session. Nevertheless, Fältskog stated, "I think our voices work so well together." The song had its radio premiere on 21 April on a Dutch radio station.

"I Was a Flower" is a string-attached piano ballad, produced and performed in a theatrical way. On 22 April, the song was made available for download only through Amazon.
 
"I Keep Them on the Floor Beside My Bed" is the first track Fältskog has written herself that has been released since "I Won't Let You Go"—the lead single from her 1985 album Eyes of a Woman—and its B-side "You're There". Fältskog commented, "Jorgen kept saying 'You have to write a song for this record'. I hadn't written any music for a long, long time. But I sat at the piano and suddenly it was there. A friend of mine said a lovely thing: 'It's in your spine. Even if you feel tired, when it's time, it will be there'."

Other tracks on the album include the contemplative "Bubble", the disco "Dance Your Pain Away", the pop "Back on Your Radio", and the piano-led "Past Forever".

Promotion

Personal appearances
Fältskog appeared on stage at G-A-Y in London on 4 May 2013 to promote the album. Although she did not perform, 10 fans had the chance to meet her backstage after the appearance. On 1 August 2013 she appeared on stage at Stockholm Gay Pride, where she was presented with her Gold record award for sales of the album in Sweden.

In the same week of the announcement of her album release, Fältskog was a guest on the Norwegian-Swedish television talk show Skavlan. The show was filmed on 14 March 2013 and aired the next day.

The Seven Network in Australia aired a special edition of the programme Sunday Night at 6:30pm on 5 May 2013 focusing on Fältskog and including new interview material shot in Sweden in late April. A television commercial for the album was shown as well. Due to popular demand, the programme showed other unaired portions of the interview on 12 May 2013.

Fältskog filmed a documentary for the BBC in mid-April, titled Agnetha: Abba and After, which aired in the UK on 11 June. Afterwards the album returned to the UK Top 40, w/e June 16, 2013, to its peak position of 6, and to a new high of number 9 on the UK Album Download Chart. This special was also aired on the Nine Network in Australia in prime time on 2 July 2013, sending the album back up to number 5 in Australia.

Whilst in London in late April and early May, Fältskog was interviewed by Patricia Schäfer for the German television station ZDF. On 2 May, the interview was broadcast on several TV programs, most prominently the society report Leute Heute.

Press and print media
The May edition of UK gay publication Attitude magazine featured an extensive new interview with Fältskog. The German gay publication Exit also featured an interview in April. In the UK and Ireland The Big Issue featured Fältskog on the cover of their June edition along with an interview about her life.

Internet and social media
In order to promote the album and its singles, several social media web profiles for Fältskog were created, including pages on Facebook, Twitter and YouTube.

Reception
BBC News called A a "tasteful and sumptuous" mid-tempo album; the disco song "Dance Your Pain Away" was noted as the only exception to the general tempo, its bassline reminiscent of ABBA's "Voulez-Vous". In a review of the album, The Times gave the album four out of five stars, calling A "a triumphant return to form by a woman presumed lost to music forever". Helen Brown awarded the album three out of five stars in a review in The Daily Telegraph, dubbing the album "as beautifully boring as ever".

Other publications, such as the German newspaper Die Zeit, highlighted Fältskog's voice, saying it sounds young and fresh and "like a young Agnetha would sound today".

The album received Gold certifications two months after its release in Australia (35,000 copies), the United Kingdom (100,000 copies), Germany (100,000 copies) and Sweden (20,000 copies).

Track listing

Notes
 Commentary for each track by Fältskog and producer Jörgen Elofsson was made available with the release of A on Spotify.

Personnel
Credits adapted from the liner notes of A.

 Agnetha Fältskog – lead vocals, backing vocals
 Gary Barlow – vocals 
 Gustaf Berg – engineering assistance
 Michael Dahlvid – engineering assistance
 Andy Earl – photography
 Jörgen Elofsson – backing vocals, production, recording, recording engineering, vocal arrangements, vocal conducting
 Janne Hansson – recording engineering
 Micke Herrström – recording engineering
 Jesper Jacobson – guitar, keyboards
 Janet Leon – backing vocals
 Per Lindvall – drums
 Max Lorentz – organ
 Bob Ludwig – mastering
 Myrra Malmberg – backing vocals
 Lasse Nilsson – recording engineering
 Peter Nordahl – orchestra arrangements, orchestra conducting, piano, production
 Gunnar Nordén – bass, guitar
 Jeanette Ohlsson – backing vocals
 Jeanette Olsson – guitar
 Simon Petrén – keyboards, programming
 Matt Read – art direction
 Niklas Sundén – accordion
 Jess Sutcliffe – mixing
 Fredrik Thomander – backing vocals, guitar keyboards, programming
 Mattias Torell – guitar
 Linda Ulvaeus – backing vocals
 Pär Westerlund – keyboards, programming

Charts

Weekly charts

Year-end charts

Certifications

Release history

References

2013 albums
Agnetha Fältskog albums
Polydor Records albums
Verve Records albums